The Argus finals systems were a set of related systems of end-of-season championship playoff tournament used commonly in Australian rules football competitions in the early part of the 20th century. The systems generally comprised a simple four-team tournament, followed by the right of the top ranked team from the home-and-away season to challenge for the premiership. The systems were named after the Melbourne newspaper The Argus, which developed and supported their use.

First Argus system
In 1901, the Victorian Football League first adopted the "Argus system", after issues had emerged with the fairness of the system which had been introduced in 1898.

The initial Argus system was, in effect, a simple four-team knock-out tournament, played as follows:
 Week One: the first semi-final was played between 2nd vs 4th, and the second semi-final was played between 1st vs 3rd.
 Week Two: the final was played between Winner SF1 vs Winner SF2
 The winner of this match became the Major Premier for the season.

First amended Argus system

The major flaw with the Argus system used in 1901 was that the four qualifying teams had a statistically equal chance to win the premiership. This particularly displeased Geelong, who had won the minor premiership, but were eliminated when beaten by Collingwood in the second semi-final.

To prevent a repeat of this situation, the VFL re-introduced a provision which had existed under the 1898 system: after the simple knock-out tournament was completed, the team with the best win–loss record for the season would have the opportunity to challenge the winner of the knock-out tournament to a Grand Final for the premiership.

This variant of the Argus system was played as follows:
 Week One: the first semi-final was played between 2nd vs 4th, and the second semi-final was played between 1st vs 3rd.
 Week Two: a final was played between Winner SF1 vs Winner SF2
If the winner of the Week Two final had the best record in the league across all matches, including all finals up to and including Week Two, then that team became the Major Premier for the season. In these cases, the final in week two has retrospectively become known as the grand final.
If the winner of the Week Two final did not have the best record in the league as defined above, then the finals progressed to Week Three.
 Week Three: the grand final was played between Team with the best record vs Winner Final
 The winner of this match became the Major Premier for the season.

Under this variant of the Argus System, the right to challenge did not automatically go to the minor premiers, i.e. the team which was ranked highest after the home-and-away season. If the minor premiership had been decided by a close margin, then any losses sustained during the finals could have cost the minor premier its right to challenge or even transferred it to another team.

An example of this occurred in the 1906 VFL season: leading into the Final, Carlton had an overall record of 15–3, and Fitzroy had an overall record of 14–4, but Fitzroy had a superior percentage to Carlton. Had Carlton lost the Final to Fitzroy, both teams would have had a record of 15–4, but Fitzroy would have been ranked above Carlton with its superior percentage, and Carlton therefore would have lost the right of challenge, meaning that Fitzroy would win the premiership. As it happened, Carlton won the Final, giving them a record of 16–3 compared with Fitzroy's 14–5, so Fitzroy had no right of challenge, and Carlton won the premiership. 

Many Carlton players and officials, including coach Jack Worrall, erroneously believed that they would have had the right to challenge had they lost the Final: this confusion led to Carlton lodging a complaint with the VFL, and the VFL made further amendments in 1907 to correct for this anomaly.

Second amended Argus system
The second version of the amended Argus system was used by the VFL between 1907 and 1930, except in 1924. This is the most widely known variation of the Argus system.

The structure of the finals was mostly the same as the first amended Argus system, except that the right to challenge was given to the Minor Premier as defined by the team on top of the ladder at the end of the home-and-away season, meaning that finals results could no longer influence the right to challenge. Additionally, it became conventional for the two semi-finals to be played on separate weekends, extending the duration of the finals from two or three weeks to three or four weeks.

 Week One: the first semi-final was played between 2nd vs 4th.
 Week Two: the second semi-final was played between 1st vs 3rd.
 Week Three: a final was played between Winner SF1 vs Winner SF2
If Minor Premier won the Week Three final, then that team was immediately awarded the Major Premiership. In these cases, the final in week three has retrospectively become known as the grand final.
If the winner of the Week Three final was not the Minor Premier, then the finals progress to Week Four. The final in week three became known as either the Final or the Preliminary Final.
 Week Four: the grand final was played between Minor Premier vs Winner Final
 The winner of this match became the Major Premier for the season.

This variation of the Argus system was introduced into the VFA in 1903, four years before it was used in the VFL, being used by that competition until 1932, and was used in amateur football until 1956.

Round-robin Argus system
For the 1924 season only, the VFL trialled a new format, in which the finals were played as a four-team round-robin, but including the Minor Premiers' right to challenge. At the end of the home-and-away season, the top four teams qualified for the finals tournament.

The finals were played over three weeks (with a provision for a fourth week), under the fixture:
Week one: 1st vs 3rd; 2nd vs 4th
Week two: 1st vs 2nd; 3rd vs 4th
Week three: 1st vs 4th; 2nd vs 3rd

At the conclusion of the first three weeks, if the Minor Premier had finished on top of the round-robin ladder, then that team automatically won the Major Premiership, but if another team won the round-robin competition, then the finals progressed to Week Four.

 Week Four: the grand final was played between Minor Premier vs 1st Round robin

The winner of this match became the Major Premier for the season. In the sole VFL season that the system was used, no Grand Final was ultimately required.

The scheme was developed as a result of demand for entry to finals matches in the early 1920s exceeding the capacity of the Melbourne Cricket Ground. It was thought that, by playing two games per weekend during the finals instead of one, more overall spectators would be able to attend the finals; and although this did occur, it did not translate to higher receipts, and the scheme was abandoned after one year.

Criticisms

After having utilised four variations of the Argus system for thirty years, three clear drawbacks had emerged:
Firstly, there was uncertainty regarding if there would be three or four finals played. This had resulted, to some extent, in the crowd for at least one of the Semi-Finals or the Final exceeding that of the grand final in nine of the 29 seasons that the system was used, including seven of the eleven seasons between 1919–1923 and 1925–1930.
Secondly, the minor premier was now seen to have an unfair advantage through its right to challenge to the point where losing the second semi-final could be seen as a preferable route to a premiership: a loss allowed for a week off, while a win would require the minor premier to play on the following weekend. 
Thirdly, there was a clear financial benefit to the clubs involved for a Challenge (or Grand) Final to be played, as it required another match to be played, bringing with it additional gate takings. As such, it was a common perception that clubs would contrive results to achieve this, leading to concern amongst the media, fans and officials that the Semi-Finals were not genuine contests.

To correct for these flaws, the VFL introduced a new system in 1931, the Page–McIntyre system, that removed the minor premiers' right to challenge in favour of giving the minor premier and the second-placed team the advantage of a "double chance": this permitted either team to lose one match (excluding the grand final) without being eliminated, and fixed the number of finals at four.

No VFL/AFL team has won four premierships in a row since the Argus system was replaced.

All leagues using the Argus system eventually migrated to the Page–McIntyre system, while the "double chance" and a fixed number of finals remain part of the finals series today.

See also
 AFL finals series
 AFL Grand Final
 Grand final
 McIntyre system
 Playoff
 Round-robin tournament
 History of Australian rules football in Victoria (1853–1900)

Notes

References 
 Hogan P: The Tigers Of Old, Richmond FC, (Melbourne), 1996. 
 Maplestone, M., Flying Higher: History of the Essendon Football Club 1872–1996, Essendon Football Club, (Melbourne), 1996. 
 Ross, J. (ed), 100 Years of Australian Football 1897–1996: The Complete Story of the AFL, All the Big Stories, All the Great Pictures, All the Champions, Every AFL Season Reported, Viking, (Ringwood), 1996.

External links
 AFL Statistics: Match Scores 1897–2007

VFL/AFL Grand Finals
History of Australian rules football
Tournament systems